When the Dead Speak (German: Wenn Tote sprechen) is a 1917 German silent drama film directed by Robert Reinert and starring Maria Carmi, Carl de Vogt and Conrad Veidt.

The film's sets were designed by the art directors Robert A. Dietrich and Artur Günther. It was shot at the Babelsberg Studios in Berlin. It is a lost film.

Cast
 Maria Carmi as Maria von Brion / Leonore von Radowitz 
 Carl de Vogt as Edgar von Radowitz 
 Conrad Veidt as Richard von Worth

References

Bibliography
 John T. Soister. Conrad Veidt on Screen: A Comprehensive Illustrated Filmography. McFarland, 2002.

External links

1917 films
Films of the German Empire
German silent feature films
Films directed by Robert Reinert
German black-and-white films
1917 drama films
German drama films
Films shot at Babelsberg Studios
Silent drama films
1910s German films
1910s German-language films